Tamara Johanna Foronda (born September 25, 1984), often known as Tamara J. Foronda, is an American volleyball player who has also played beach volleyball and handball in addition to her sports career. She has represented United States at the Deaflympics on three occasions in three different sporting events. She has been a good court volleyball player and used to play volleyball during her leisure time. She graduated at the Gallaudet University.

Career 
Tamara Foronda competed at the 2001 Summer Deaflympics in the women's handball competition as a handball player. She was also the member of the US deaf handball team that won the silver medal in the 2001 Summer Deaflympics.

She went on to participate at the 2005 Summer Deaflympics as a beach volleyball player and was also the part of the US deaf beach volleyball team which won the bronze medal during the multi-sport event. In 2005, she was recognised as a recipient for the Widex athlete of the Year Award for her great sportsmanship and for the fair play at the 2005 Summer Deaflympics. In the same year, Foronda received a prize cash of US$5000 as a fairplay award from WIDEX. She was also nominated as the 2005 Deaf Sportswoman of the Year Finalist with 18 points in the women's category. Most notably, an article including a photo of her shooting action at the 2005 Summer Deaflympics was featured in the May 2005 issue of Volleyball Magazine. Tamara Foronda also won the USA Deaf Sports Federation's Sportswoman of the Year award in 2005.

Tamara Foronda participated in her last Summer Deaflympic event in 2009 as a volleyball player and was also the key member of the US deaf volleyball team which won the silver medal in the competition.

References 

1984 births
Living people
Deaf volleyball players
American female handball players
American women's beach volleyball players
Sportspeople from California
American women's volleyball players
American deaf people
21st-century American women